Wolfroy Goes to Town is a studio album by Will Oldham. It was released under the name Bonnie "Prince" Billy on Drag City in 2011.

Critical reception

Critical response to Wolfroy Goes to Town was generally positive. At Metacritic, which assigns a normalized rating out of 100 to reviews from mainstream critics, the album has received an average score of 76 ("Generally favorable reviews"), based on 21 professional reviews. Anthony Carew, writing for the Alt Music Guide, declared that the album was Oldham's "best, or at least most beautiful, since 1999's I See a Darkness". John Mulvey, in Uncut, noted that the album's "mood is even more quiet, delicate and sepulchral than that of The Wonder Show of the World", and approved of the sense of "unflinching intimacy, extreme focus... finely-wrought songs whittled down to their essence, then allowed to unravel in the most stately and unhurried way". Writing for Dusted, Joe Bernardi also commented on the album's starkness, suggesting that Wolfroy Goes To Town is "the sound of a lack, a series of sparse arrangements complementing desolate lyrics about rural desolation... The result makes for a listening experience that’s intense and potentially awkward, but one that also somehow rings true." No Ripcord'''s David John Wood compared the album to The Wicker Man'', advising listeners not to "listen in the dark".

Track listing

Personnel
Credits adapted from liner notes.
 Will Oldham – music, mixing
 Ben Boye – electric piano, synthesizer, pump organ, vocals
 Van Campbell – drums, percussion
 Shahzad Ismaily – percussion, guitar, vocals, mixing
 Emmett Kelly – guitar, mandolin, vocals, mixing
 Danny Kiely – bass guitar
 Angel Olsen – vocals
 Paul Oldham – mastering
 Sammy Harkham – illustration
 Shane Spaulding – photography
 Marko Markewycz – label design
 Dan Osborn – layout

Charts

References

External links
 

2011 albums
Will Oldham albums
Drag City (record label) albums
Domino Recording Company albums